Gerardus Clark (January 20, 1786 – August 23, 1860) was an American lawyer.

He was the son of William and Annis (Bostwick) Clark, and was born in New Milford, Connecticut, January 20, 1786.

He graduated from Yale University in 1804.  While in College he often acted as amanuensis of Dr. Timothy Dwight IV, who was then engaged in writing his Travels in New England and New York (1821–1822), a fact to which he referred with great pleasure. Soon after graduating he went to New York and began the study of law in the office of John G. Bogert, Esq. He was admitted to the bar in New York in 1813, and during a long life was engaged in an extensive and successful practice in that city.  In 1825, he married Miss Ann Maria Bogert of New York, who, with their two children, survived him.

In 1850, he removed his residence to New Rochelle, New York, but continued in active business in the city until a few weeks previous to his death. He was at one time President of the Board of Education of the City of New York, and while in that place he wrote a celebrated paper defending the use of the Bible in Common Schools.

He died in New Rochelle, N. Y., August 23, 1860, aged 74. His body was buried in his native town, near the spot where he was born.

1786 births
1860 deaths
Yale University alumni
New York (state) lawyers
New York City Department of Education
19th-century American lawyers